Craig Howard (born 8 April 1974) is an Australian former cricketer. He played 16 first-class cricket matches for Victoria between 1993 and 1996.

See also
 List of Victoria first-class cricketers

References

External links
 

1974 births
Living people
Australian cricketers
Victoria cricketers
Cricketers from Melbourne